The Dutch pavilion houses the Netherlands's national representation during the Venice Biennale arts festivals.

Background

Organization and building 

The pavilion, designed by Ferdinand Boberg, was originally built in 1912. It was later razed and rebuilt in 1953 by Gerrit Thomas Rietveld.

Since 1995, the Mondriaan Foundation has been responsible for the Dutch entry at the Biennale di Venezia, appointing a curator for each entry.

Representation by year

Art 

 1956 — Constant, Bart van der Leck, Piet Mondriaan, André Volten
 1964 — Karel Appel, Lucebert, J. Mooy
 1966 — Constant Nieuwenhuys with paintings, sculptures, New Babylon objects, watercolors and drawings
 1968 — Carel Visser
1970 – Willem Graatsma, Jan Slothouber
1972 – Jan Dibbets
1974 – (no biennal)
1976 – Jan Dibbets, Jerry de Keizer, Herman Herzberger
1978 – Douwe Jan Bakker, Sjoerd Buisman, Krijn Giezen, Hans de Vries
 1980 — Ger van Elk
 1982 — Stanley Brouwn
 1984 — Armando
 1986 — Reinier Lucassen
 1988 — Henk Visch
 1990 — Rob Scholte
 1993 — Niek Kemps
 1995 — Marlene Dumas, Maria Roosen, Marijke van Warmerdam (Curator: Chris Dercon)
 1997 — Aernout Mik, Willem Oorebeek (Curators: Leontine Coelewij, Arno van Roosmalen)
 1999 — Daan van Golden (Curator: Karel Schampers)
 2001 — Liza May Post (Curator: Jaap Guldemond)
 2003 — Carlos Amorales, Alicia Framis, Meschac Gaba, Jeanne van Heeswijk, Erik van Lieshout (Curator: Rein Wolfs)
 2005 — Jeroen De Rijke / Willem de Rooij (Curator: Martijn van Nieuwenhuyzen)
 2007 — Aernout Mik (Curator Maria Hlavajova)
 2009 — Fiona Tan (Curator: Saskia Bos)
 2011 — Barbara Visser, Ernst van der Hoeven, Herman Verkerk, Johannes Schwartz, Joke Robaard, Maureen Mooren, Paul Kuipers, Sanneke van Hassel, Yannis Kyriakides (Curator: Guus Beumer)
 2013 — Mark Manders (Curator: Lorenzo Benedetti)
 2015 — Herman de Vries (Curators: Colin Huizing, Cees de Boer)
 2017 — Wendelien van Oldenborgh (Curator: Lucy Cotter)
 2019 — Remy Jungerman, Iris Kensmil (Curator: Benno Tempel)

In 2022 the Dutch representation (Melanie Bonajo (Curators: Orlando Maaike Gouwenberg, Geir Haraldseth and Soraya Pol)) will not take place in the Rietveld building, but in the Chiesetta della Misericordia, while the Rietveld pavilion will be used for the Estonian exhibition.

References

Bibliography

Further reading

External links 

 

Dutch contemporary art
National pavilions